This is a list of people who have served as Vice-Admiral of Westmorland.

Reginald Beseley 1559–? (also Vice-Admiral of Northumberland 1559–, Vice-Admiral of Durham 1559, Vice-Admiral of Cumberland 1559–1563 and Vice-Admiral of Yorkshire 1559-1563)
Thomas Standeven 1563–?
Sir Valentine Browne 1568–1574 (also Vice-Admiral of Northumberland 1563–1564 and 1568–1574 and Vice-Admiral of Durham 1568)
Henry Carey, 1st Baron Hunsdon 1575 – aft. 1587 (also Vice-Admiral of Northumberland 1575–1596, Vice-Admiral of Durham 1575–1596 and Vice-Admiral of Cumberland 1586 – aft. 1587)
Sir Robert Carey 1594–?
Theophilus Howard, 2nd Earl of Suffolk 1622–1640 (also Vice-Admiral of Northumberland 1611-1640, Vice-Admiral of Durham 1611-1640 and Vice-Admiral of Cumberland 1611–1640)
vacant
John Moore 1644–1650
vacant
Charles Howard, 1st Earl of Carlisle 1661–1685 (also Vice-Admiral of Northumberland 1661-1685, Vice-Admiral of Durham 1661–1685, Vice-Admiral of Cumberland 1661-1685 and Vice-Admiral of Westmorland 1661-1685)
John Lowther, 1st Viscount Lonsdale 1686–1700
vacant
Sir Richard Musgrave, 2nd Baronet 1702–1710
Sir William Pennington, 1st Baronet 1710–1715
Sir James Lowther, 4th Baronet 1715–1755
vacant
James Lowther, 1st Earl of Lonsdale 1765–1802

References
Institute of Historical Research

Westmo
Vice-Admirals
Vice-Admirals, Westmorland
Military history of Cumbria